Stephen Ray Wigginton is an American former attorney who served as the United States Attorney for the Southern District of Illinois from 2010 to 2015.

Biographical sketch
Stephen Ray Wigginton was raised in Southern Illinois and attended Southern Illinois University at Edwardsville and later the Saint Louis University School of Law. He began a career in corporate law before choosing to become a litigator with the St. Louis’ Circuit Attorney’s Office. Two years later, he returned to the private sector as a litigator. He would later go on to form the firm Weilmuenster & Wigginton PC and serve as a part-time Assistant State's Attorney in Madison County, Illinois.

Governor Rod Blagojevich appointed Wigginton to be a member of the Southern Illinois University Board of Trustees for a term commencing August 8, 2005 and ending January 17, 2011 to which he was confirmed by the Illinois Senate. Wiggington resigned from the Southern Illinois University Board of Trustees in 2010. Governor Pat Quinn appointed Donna L. Manering of Makanda, Illinois to succeed Wigginton and she was later confirmed by the Illinois Senate.

In 2009, Senator Dick Durbin sent a short list consisting of Wigginton and the then-sitting U.S. Attorney A. Courtney Cox to President Barack Obama for consideration. President Obama announced his intention to appoint Wigginton the United States Attorney for the Southern District of Illinois in 2010. The United States Senate Committee on the Judiciary voted favorably on Wigginton's nomination on June 24, 2010 and the full United States Senate voted to confirm Wigginton by voice vote on August 5, 2010. Wigginton was sworn in on August 27, 2010. On November 24, 2015, he announced his resignation as U.S. Attorney effective midnight on December 11, 2015.

On May 23, 2017, he was charged with driving under the influence after causing a one car crash in Troy, Illinois. In 2019, the DOJ revealed that Wigginton had been investigated of sexual misconduct. Wigginton has since voluntarily not renewed his license to practice law in Illinois.

References

Living people
United States Attorneys for the Southern District of Illinois
Illinois Democrats
Year of birth missing (living people)
Saint Louis University School of Law alumni
Southern Illinois University Edwardsville alumni